The 2018 Saint Francis Red Flash football team represented Saint Francis University in the 2018 NCAA Division I FCS football season. They were led by ninth-year head coach Chris Villarrial and played their home games at DeGol Field. They were a member of the Northeast Conference. They finished the season 4–7, 2–4 in NEC play to finish in a tie for fifth place.

Previous season
The Red Flash finished the 2017 season 5–6, 3–3 in NEC play to finish in fourth place.

Preseason

Award watch lists

NEC coaches poll
The NEC released their preseason coaches poll on July 24, 2018, with the Red Flash predicted to finish in fourth place.

Preseason All-NEC team
The Red Flash placed five players on the preseason all-NEC team.

Offense

Kamron Lewis – WR

Mederick Flavius– OL

Defense

Hakeem Kinard – DB

Nick Rinella – DB

Special teams

Andrew Zecca – P

Schedule

 Source: Schedule

Game summaries

at Lehigh

Delaware State

Richmond

at Albany

West Virginia Wesleyan

at Wagner

Duquesne

at Robert Morris

Bryant

Central Connecticut

at Sacred Heart

References

Saint Francis
Saint Francis Red Flash football seasons
Saint Francis Red Flash football